= Nacht-Express =

East German tabloid newspaper (1945–1953)

- Type: Daily newspaper
- Publisher: Express-Verlag, G.m.b.H
- Founded: 7 December 1945
- Ceased publication: 30 April 1953
- Language: German
- City: East Berlin
- Country: East Germany
- OCLC number: 11992519

Nacht-Express was a daily tabloid newspaper published in East Berlin, East Germany, between 1945 and 1953. It was one of the five East German newspapers of which licenses were owned by non-partisan or non-official individuals.

== History and profile ==
Nacht-Express was first published in Berlin on 7 December 1945. Its license holder was a private individual who had no party affiliation or no governmental post. Therefore, the paper was allegedly independent. The publisher of Nacht-Express was Express-Verlag, G.m.b.H based in East Berlin. The paper sold 250,000 copies in its first year. Nacht-Express was an evening newspaper which focused on entertainment-oriented news. It rarely covered public affairs and political news. In the front page it featured world news which was taken from Soviet sources, British sources, Associated Press and United Press. The paper had detailed sections for sports and for the fiction, criticism, or light literature. Paul Wiegler was the editor of the latter section.

Rudolf Kurtz was the founding editor-in-chief of the paper. One of the contributors was Hannolore Holtz who wrote on cultural and entertainment news. The paper ceased publication on 30 April 1953.
